Redhills (sometimes spelt Red Hills) is a hamlet in the civil parish of Dacre, in the Eden district, in the English county of Cumbria.

Location 
It is located on the A66 road just west of the market town of Penrith, near the River Eamont. Redhills has a Motel, council offices, a business park, and a nine-hole golf driving range. There is also nearby the Rheged Discovery Centre.

References 

Hamlets in Cumbria
Dacre, Cumbria